Meaty may refer to:

 Meaty taste or umami
 Meaty, an essay collection by Samantha Irby